Lichtenstein's seahorse (Hippocampus lichtensteinii) is a species of fish in the family Syngnathidae. This species requires further investigation to ensure validity.

The seahorse is named in honor of zoologist Martin Heinrich Carl Lichtenstein (1780-1857) of the Museum für Naturkunde Berlin, who provided the type specimen.

Description
Lichtenstein's seahorse is pale brown in colour without markings. It reaches a maximum length of 4.0 cm. Its coronet is high, columnar or knob-like, lacking spines.

Distribution
Lichtenstein's seahorse is found in the Western Indian Ocean and the Red Sea.

References

 Project Seahorse 2002.  Hippocampus lichtensteinii.   2006 IUCN Red List of Threatened Species.   (Downloaded on 4 August 2007.)

Hippocampus (genus)
Taxa named by Johann Jakob Kaup
Fish described in 1856
Taxonomy articles created by Polbot